Ostrowskia is a genus  of plants in the family Campanulaceae. There is only one known species, Ostrowskia magnifica, native to the Central Asian nations of Afghanistan, Kyrgyzstan and Tajikistan.

References

External links
Pacific Rim Native Plant Nursery, Hillkeep Nature Reserve, Chilliwack Mountain, British Columbia, Canada, Ostrowskia magnifica 
Pacific Bulb Society, Ostrowskia
Picsearch, Ostrowskia pictures

Campanuloideae
Flora of Kyrgyzstan
Flora of Tajikistan
Flora of Afghanistan
Monotypic Campanulaceae genera